Dorcadion turkestanicum is a species of beetle in the family Cerambycidae. It was described by Kraatz in 1881. It is known from China and Kazakhstan.

References

turkestanicum
Beetles described in 1881